William McColl ( – 20 August 1903) was a Scottish professional footballer, who played as an inside forward for several English and Scottish clubs. He played one match for the Scotland national football team, in a 2–2 draw with Wales on 23 March 1895.

He was the grandfather of Ian McColl, who was also capped by Scotland and later managed the national team.

References

Sources

External links

1865 births
1903 deaths
Footballers from Stirling (council area)
Scottish footballers
Scotland international footballers
Association football inside forwards
Vale of Leven F.C. players
Greenock Morton F.C. players
Manchester City F.C. players
Accrington F.C. players
Burnley F.C. players
Scottish Football League players
English Football League players
Renton F.C. players
Year of birth uncertain
Date of birth missing
Place of death missing